The 2018–19 season is PAS Giannina F.C.'s 24th competitive season in the top flight of Greek football, 9th season in the Super League Greece, and 53rd year in existence as a football club. They also compete in the Greek Cup.

Players 
updated 26 February 2019

International players

Foreign players

Personnel

Management

Coaching staff

medical staff

Academy

Transfers

Summer

In

Out 

For recent transfers, see List of Greek football transfers summer 2018

Winter

In

Out 

For recent transfers, see List of Greek football transfers winter 2018–19

Pre-season and friendlies 
   The matches was part of 45 minutes games.

Competitions

Super League Greece

League table

Results summary

Fixtures

Greek Cup 
PAS Giannina will enter the Greek Cup at the fourth round.

Group A

Matches

Round of 16

Statistics

Appearances 

Super League Greece

Goalscorers 

Super League Greece

Clean sheets

Disciplinary record

References

External links 

 Official Website

PAS Giannina F.C. seasons
Giannina